Hubbs is a surname. It may refer to the following notable people:

 Carl Leavitt Hubbs (1894–1979), American ichthyologist
 Clark Hubbs (1921-2008), American ichthyologist and son of Carl Leavitt Hubbs
 Dan Hubbs (born 1971), American college baseball coach
 Irving G. Hubbs (1870–1952), American lawyer and politician
 John Hubbs (1874–1952), Canadian politician
 Ken Hubbs (1941–1964), American baseball player
 Orlando Hubbs (1840–1930), American politician
 Robert Hubbs III (born 1985), American basketball player

See also
 Coahuilix de hubbs snail
 Hubbs' beaked whale
 Hubbs House